Typhoon Vanessa, known in the Philippines as Typhoon Toyang, was the strongest tropical cyclone of the 1984 Pacific typhoon season, and one of the most intense tropical cyclones on record. The 22nd named storm, twelfth typhoon, and first super typhoon of the 1984 Pacific typhoon season.

Meteorological history 

This system formed in the near equatorial trough southeast of Ponape on October 20. The system moved northwest to just north of Ponape as it slowly developed. The disturbance strengthened into a tropical depression by October 22 and a tropical storm October 23. On the next day, Vanessa strengthened into a minimal typhoon.

Moving west-northwest, Vanessa began to explosively intensify on October 25, becoming a super typhoon two days later. At its peak, it had a pressure of 880 mb, which makes it tied as the 6th most intense tropical cyclone on record,  behind Ida of 1958 only 10 millibars higher than the record-setting Typhoon Tip of 1979 later that day. Its central pressure fell 100 mb in 48 hours, which was at a near record pace. The intense cyclone recurved to the northeast on October 27 and October 28 as a cold front approached from the northwest. Vanessa slowly weakened and began to merge with the frontal boundary, becoming a storm-force extratropical cyclone late on October 30 before getting absorbed by the front later that day.

Impact 
Damage on the island totaled US$1.7 million (1984 dollars), mainly to the banana crop.

Though the storm did not directly impact the Philippines, its outer bands triggered flooding that killed 63 people.

References

External links 
 Digital Typhoon : Typhoon 198422 (VANESSA) - National Institute of Informatics

1984 Pacific typhoon season